In social and developmental psychology, an individual's implicit theory of intelligence refers to his or her fundamental underlying beliefs regarding whether or not intelligence or abilities can change, developed by Carol Dweck and colleagues.

History
Ellen Leggett developed implicit theories of intelligence in 1985. Her paper "Children's entity and incremental theories of intelligence: Relationships to achievement behavior" was presented at the 1985 meeting of the Eastern Psychological Association in Boston.
As a result, Dweck and her collaborators began studying how individuals unknowingly (or implicitly) assess their own intelligence and abilities through interaction and interpretation of their environment. It was assumed that these assessments ultimately influenced the individual's goals, motivations, behaviors, and self-esteem. The researchers began by looking at students who were highly motivated to achieve, and students who were not, though the levels of self-achievement were not clarified. They noticed that the highly motivated students thrived in the face of challenge while the other students quit or withdrew from their work, but critically, a student's raw intelligence did not predict whether a student was highly motivated or not. Rather, they discovered that these two groups of students held different beliefs (or implicit theories) about intelligence, categorized as entity or incremental theories, which affected their classroom performance.

Entity theory vs. incremental theory
Carol Dweck identified two different mindsets regarding intelligence beliefs. The entity theory of intelligence refers to an individual's belief that abilities are fixed traits. For entity theorists, if perceived ability to perform a task is high, the perceived possibility for mastery is also high. In turn, if perceived ability is low, there is little perceived possibility of mastery, often regarded as an outlook of "learned helplessness" (Park & Kim, 2015). However, the incremental theory of intelligence proposes that intelligence and ability are malleable traits which can be improved upon through effort and hard work. For incremental theorists, there is a perceived possibility of mastery even when initial ability to perform a task is low. Those who subscribe to this theory of intelligence "don't necessarily believe that anyone can become an Einstein or Mozart, but they do understand even Einstein and Mozart had to put in years of effort to become who they were". This possibility of mastery contributes in part to intrinsic motivation of individuals to perform a task, since there is perceived potential for success in the task.

Individuals may fall on some spectrum between the two types of theories, and their views may change given different situations and training. By observing an individual's motivation and behavior towards achievement, an individual's general mindset regarding intelligence is revealed. About 40% of the general population believe the entity theory, 40% believe the incremental theory, and 20% do not fit well into either category.

Performance level on a task is not always predetermined by an individual's mindset. Previous research on the subject has shown that when faced with failure on an initial task, those with an entity theory mindset will perform worse on subsequent tasks that measure the same ability than those with an incremental theory mindset (Park & Kim, 2015). However, a 2015 research study published in the Personality and Social Psychology Bulletin found that when the subsequent task measured a different ability, entity theorists performed better than incremental theorists. In certain situations, the incremental theorists studied were self-critical about the previous failure; these thoughts disrupted their performance on the subsequent task. Incremental theorists' reactions to failure are traditionally seen as an "adaptive response", meaning they link the failure to insufficient effort and therefore search for ways to improve their performance. If there is no opportunity for improvement on the task, such as in the research study, thoughts of doubt about the failure affect future performance (Park & Kim, 2015).

For the individuals who believed in an entity theory of intelligence, there were no such feelings of doubt when performing the second task because they perceived the task as not measuring the ability that they lacked on the initial task. After the first failure, self-critical thoughts are less likely to linger in their minds while performing the second task; the study points out that "entity theorists will not necessarily feel helpless because the second task does not measure the ability they think they lack" (Park & Kim 2015). Therefore, in this study, entity theorists performed better on the subsequent task than did incremental theorists if the measured ability was different.

Motivation toward achievement

Different types of goals
An individual's motivation towards achievement is shaped by their implicit theory of intelligence (and their related implicit theories about domain-specific aptitudes) and its associated goals. J.G. Nicholls proposed two different types of goals related to achievement. Task involvement goals involve individuals aiming to improve their own abilities. Ego involvement goals involve individuals wanting to better themselves compared to others. Dweck modified Nicholls' ideas by proposing performance goals and mastery goals. Performance goals are associated with entity theory and lead individuals to perform actions in order to appear capable and avoid negative judgments about their skills. Mastery goals are associated with incremental theory and lead individuals to engage and work in order to gain expertise in new things.

Response to challenge
Individuals who believe they have the ability to grow and add to their knowledge gladly accept challenges that can aid in growth towards mastery. Individuals who believe their abilities are fixed will also accept and persist through challenges as long as they feel they will succeed and their abilities will not be questioned. However, when these individuals lack confidence in their abilities, they will avoid, procrastinate, or possibly cheat in challenging situations that might make them appear incompetent. These behaviors can lead to a sense of learned helplessness and stymied intellectual growth.

Attribution of failure
Attribution of failure and coping with that failure are highly related to mindset. Individuals who subscribe to an incremental view will attribute a failure to not yet having learned something, looking at something from the incorrect perspective, or not working hard enough. All of these problems can be corrected through effort, leading incrementalist individuals to continually seek any situation that will intellectually better themselves. Also they are more likely to engage in remedial action to correct mistakes if necessary. Those with fixed intelligence views attribute failure to their own lack of ability.

Self-regulated learning
Individuals with an incremental mindset will take feedback and channel that into determination to try new strategies for solving a given problem, a large part of self-regulated learning (or learning to effectively guide your own studies). As a result, incrementalist individuals are more effective at self-regulated learning, ultimately leading them to be more productive at developing plans for learning and making connections between topics which promotes deeper processing of information.

Self-esteem
Incrementalist individuals generally have positive and stable self-esteem and do not question their intelligence in the face of failure, instead remaining eager and curious. Individuals with entity beliefs mostly attribute failure or having to exert effort to a lack of ability. Therefore, if they do not succeed at some task, they are unlikely to seek similar tasks or will quit trying. They believe that putting in effort will undermine their competence because if they were smart enough to begin with, they would not need to put in effort. These individuals will limit themselves to situations where they believe they will succeed and may limit themselves in the face of negative feedback, which they will likely interpret as a personal attack on their ability. These individuals' self-esteem as well as their enjoyment of a task may suffer when they encounter failure and the associated feelings of helplessness. Many children who see failure as a reflection of their intelligence will even lie about their scores to strangers to preserve their self-esteem and competence, since they connect their judgments of self to their performance. Students who see the value of effort do not show such a tendency. The majority of what are considered "best students" are often concerned with failure. Students who achieve a great deal of academic success early on might be most likely to believe their intelligence is fixed because they so frequently have been praised regarding their intelligence. They may have faced fewer opportunities for setbacks and do not have much experience persisting through errors. Longitudinal research shows that individuals who endorse entity beliefs experience decreasing self-esteem throughout their college years, while individuals who endorse incremental beliefs experience an increase.

Development
Implicit theories of intelligence develop at an early age and are subtly influenced by parents and educators and the type of praise they give for successful work. Typically it has been assumed that any sort of praise will have a positive impact on a child's self-confidence and achievement. However, different types of praise can lead to the development of different views on intelligence. Young children who hear praise that values high intelligence as a measure of success, such as "You must be smart at these problems," may link failure with a lack of intelligence and are more susceptible to developing an entity mindset. Often children are given high praise for their intelligence after relatively easy success, which sets them up to develop counterproductive behaviors in dealing with academic setbacks, rather than fostering confidence and the enjoyment of learning. Praise for intelligence connects performance with ability, rather than effort, leading these individuals to develop "performance" goals to prove competence. However students who receive praise valuing hard work as a measure of success, such as "You must have worked hard at these problems," more often pursue mastery goals that underlie an incremental mindset.

Subtle differences in speech to children that promote non-generic praise (i.e. "You did a good job drawing") versus generic praise (i.e. "You are a good drawer"), lead children to respond to later criticism in a way that demonstrates an incremental mindset.

Shifting from entity to incremental mindset to improve achievement
Understanding differences between those who believe in entity theory versus incremental theory allows educators to predict how students will persevere in a classroom. Then, educators can change behaviors that may contribute to academic shortcomings for those with entity tendencies and low confidence in their abilities. While these implicit beliefs regarding where intelligence comes from are relatively stable across time and permeate all aspects of behavior, it is possible to change peoples' perspectives on their abilities for a given task with the right priming. Dweck's 2006 book Mindset: How You Can Fill Your Potential focuses on teaching individuals how they can encourage thinking with a growth mindset for a happier and more successful existence.

Elementary-aged students
Given the opportunity for fifth graders to choose their own learning tasks, when primed towards gaining skills, they will pick challenging tasks. When they are primed towards assessment, they will pick tasks that they think they will be successful at to show off their abilities. Thus, they will forgo new learning if it means the possibility of making mistakes. If the situation is framed in a manner that emphasizes learning and process rather than success, mindset can be altered.

Middle school-aged children
Transitioning between elementary school and middle school is a time when many students with an entity theory of intelligence begin to experience their first taste of academic difficulty. Transitioning students with low abilities can be oriented to a growth mentality when taught that their brains are like muscles that get stronger through hard work and effort. This lesson can result in a marked improvement in grades compared to students with similar abilities and resources available to them who do not receive this information on the brain.

College-aged students
One consequence for individuals experiencing the stereotype threat (or worrying about conforming to a negative stereotype associated with a member of one's group) is that they will also experience an entity mindset. College students are able to overcome this negative impact after participating in an incremental thinking intervention, afterwards reporting higher levels of happiness according to the theory.

Predictive power of knowing an individual's theory

Success in school and on tests
An individual's implicit theory of intelligence can predict future success, particularly navigating life transitions that are often associated with challenging situations, such as moving from elementary to middle school. Students followed throughout their middle school careers showed that those who possessed growth mindset tendencies made better grades and had a more positive view on the role of effort than students who possessed fixed mindset tendencies with similar abilities, two years following the initial survey. Those with theoretical entity beliefs worry more about tests even in situations where they have experienced some success, spend less time practicing before tests, and thus have shown reduced performance on IQ tests relative to others in their environment. If the situation is framed in a manner that emphasizes learning and process rather than success, mindset can be altered. Individuals with fixed mindsets may engage in less practice in order to allow themselves an excuse besides low ability for potentially poor performance in order to preserve their egos. Students who have learning goals (associated with incremental beliefs) are more internally motivated and successful in the face of a challenging college course. After the first test in a course, those who possess learning goals are likely to improve their grades on the next test whereas those with performance goals did not.

Negotiation skills
Incrementalist individuals tend to have stronger negotiating skills, believing that with effort a better deal can be reached. This finding may have implications for more favorable working conditions for those with incrementalist beliefs.

"Easily learned = easily remembered" heuristic
According to theory, individuals who believe their intelligence can grow think about information in their world differently even outside of academic challenges, seen by use of a different heuristic when making judgments of learning (JOLs), or estimates of learning. Those with entity views are generally guided by the principle "easily learned" means "easily remembered," which means that when learning information, these individuals will make low JOLs when a task is difficult. Those with incremental views did not follow this "easily learned" means "easily remembered" principle and gave higher judgments to more difficult tasks, perhaps believing that if more effort is put into the learning because it is harder, those items will be better remembered.

Other behaviors governed by implicit theories
Research into implicit theories of intelligence has led to additional discoveries expanding the idea of entity vs incremental mindset to other areas outside of just intelligence. Views about intelligence are just a single manifestation of a more general entity or incremental mindset which reveals a great deal about a person's view of the world and self. Generally those with entity views will see all characteristics, in addition to intelligence, as innate and static while those with incremental views see characteristics as malleable. Entity beliefs lead to more stereotyping, greater rigidity in prejudiced beliefs, and difficulties during conflict resolution. Incremental views are connected to more open beliefs and amenability during conflict resolutions. In intimate relationships, those who possess an incremental mindset tend to believe that people can change and exhibit more forgiveness than those with entity mindsets. Similarly, those with entity beliefs are likely to endorse the fundamental attribution error more than those with incremental views, who tend to focus much more on the situation than internal characteristics of an individual.

See also
Goal orientation
Mindset
Intelligence

References

Belief
Intelligence